Jade Peters may refer to:

Jade-Lianna Peters, voice actress on Ni Hao, Kai-Lan
Jade Mayjean Peters, competitor on The Voice UK (series 3)